Edward Pease may refer to:

 Edward A. Pease (born 1951), former US congressman from Indiana
 Edward Pease (railway pioneer) (1767–1858), railway pioneer
 Edward R. Pease (1857–1955), first cousin twice removed of Edward Pease (1767–1858), founder of the Fabian Society

See also 
 Pease family